The Redonda Formation is a geologic formation exposed in eastern New Mexico. It contains vertebrate fossils of the late Triassic Period. Fossil theropod tracks have been reported from the formation.

Description
The formation consists of interbedded fine-grained red-brown sandstone and mudstone. It conformably overlies the Bull Canyon Formation and underlies the Entrada Formation.

Fossils
The formation has few fossil plants, with only Neocalamites reported, but it contains abundant invertebrate fossils (conchostracans and ostracods) and a diverse assemblage of vertebrate fossils.

Vertebrate fauna

Fish

Stereospondyls

Synapsids

Archosauriforms

History of investigation 
The unit was first named as the Redonda Member of the Chinle Formation by Dobrovolny and Summerson in 1947. Griggs and Read raised the unit to formation rank in 1959, and also assigned an age of late Triassic based on the presence of tracks of a bipedal dinosaur and of a phytosaur skull.

See also 
 List of dinosaur-bearing rock formations
 List of stratigraphic units with theropod tracks

References

Bibliography 
 
 
 
 Weishampel, David B.; Dodson, Peter; and Osmólska, Halszka (eds.): The Dinosauria, 2nd, Berkeley: University of California Press. 861 pp. .

Triassic formations of New Mexico
Norian Stage
Shale formations of the United States
Mudstone formations
Siltstone formations
Conglomerate formations
Limestone formations
Deltaic deposits
Fluvial deposits
Lacustrine deposits
Paleontology in New Mexico